Ray Lougheed (born 2 September 1934) is a Canadian wrestler. He competed in the men's freestyle lightweight at the 1960 Summer Olympics.

References

External links
 

1934 births
Living people
Canadian male sport wrestlers
Olympic wrestlers of Canada
Wrestlers at the 1960 Summer Olympics
Sportspeople from Thunder Bay
Commonwealth Games medallists in wrestling
Commonwealth Games silver medallists for Canada
Wrestlers at the 1966 British Empire and Commonwealth Games
Pan American Games medalists in wrestling
Pan American Games silver medalists for Canada
Wrestlers at the 1967 Pan American Games
20th-century Canadian people
Medallists at the 1966 British Empire and Commonwealth Games